Cemitério da Consolação is a cemetery in São Paulo, Brazil. Located along the north side of Rua da Consolação in the district of Consolação, it was founded on 15 August 1858, with the name of Cemitério Municipal, being the city's first public graveyard.

The cemetery is known by its pieces of funerary art, with graves, statues and mausoleums built and sculpted by artists such as Victor Brecheret, Ramos de Azevedo, Luigi Brizzolara and Galileo Emendabili.

Notable burials

The cemetery houses the tombs of notable figures of São Paulo and Brazilian history. Some of them are:
 Tarsila do Amaral, artist
 Mario de Andrade, writer
 Oswald de Andrade, writer
 Ademar de Barros, politician
 Maria Bueno, tennis player
 Domitila de Castro, Marchioness of Santos, noblewoman and royal mistress
 José da Costa Carvalho, Marquis of Monte Alegre, Prime Minister of Brazil
 Alexandre Levy, pianist, composer and conductor
 Monteiro Lobato, writer
 Washington Luis, 13th President of Brazil
 Antonio de Alcântara Machado, journalist, politician and writer
 Count Francesco Matarazzo, Italian Brazilian businessman
 Olívia Guedes Penteado, art patron and philanthropist
 Campos Sales, 4th President of Brazil

References

External links

 

1858 establishments in Brazil
Cemeteries in São Paulo